DD-peptidase may refer to:
 Muramoylpentapeptide carboxypeptidase, an enzyme
 Serine-type D-Ala-D-Ala carboxypeptidase, an enzyme